Cash is a 1933 British comedy film directed by Zoltan Korda and starring Edmund Gwenn, Wendy Barrie and Robert Donat. It was made by Alexander Korda's London Film Productions.

Plot
A businessman on the brink of bankruptcy struggles to keep his company afloat.

Cast
 Edmund Gwenn - Edmund Gilbert
 Wendy Barrie - Lilian Gilbert
 Robert Donat - Paul Martin
 Morris Harvey - Meyer
 Lawrence Grossmith - Joseph
 Clifford Heatherley - Hunt
 Hugh E. Wright - Jordan
 Anthony Holles - Inspector

References

Bibliography
 Kulik, Karol. Alexander Korda: The Man Who Could Work Miracles. Virgin Books, 1990.

External links

1933 films
British comedy films
1933 comedy films
Films directed by Zoltán Korda
Films set in London
Films produced by Alexander Korda
British black-and-white films
Films shot at Imperial Studios, Elstree
1930s English-language films
1930s British films